This is a list of schools in Bacoor, Cavite, Philippines.

Public schools

Elementary schools

 Aniban Elementary School
 Bacoor Elementary School
 Bayanan Elementary School
 Digman Elementary School
 Dulong Bayan Elementary School
 Gawaran Elementary School
 Gov. P.F. Espiritu Elementary School
 Habay Elementary School
 Ligas Elementary School
 Ligas II Elementary School
 Likha Elementary School
 Longos Elementary School
 Mabolo Elementary School
 Maliksi Elementary School
 Malipay Elementary School
 Mambog Elementary School
 Molino Elementary School
 Niog Elementary School
 Progressive Elementary School
 Poblacion Elementary School
 Queens Row Elementary School 
 Real Elementary School
 Salinas Elementary School
 San Nicolas Elementary School
 Sineguelasan Elementary School
 Soldiers Hills Elementary School
 Talaba Elementary School
 Zapote Elementary School

Secondary schools
 Bacoor National High School - Main, Molino I
 Bacoor National High School - Tabing Dagat Annex
 Bacoor National High School - Villa Maria Annex, Molino III
 Bacoor National High School - Gawaran Annex
 City of Bacoor National High School - Georgetown Annex, Molino IV
 City of Bacoor National High School - San Nicolas Annex, San Nicolas III
 City of Bacoor National High School - Salinas Annex, Salinas II
 City of Bacoor National High School - Springville Annex, Molino III
 Responsible Village Leaders Learning Academy (REVILLA) High School, Maliksi I
 Eastern Bacoor National High School, Queens Row

Tertiary Schools
 Cavite State University - Bacoor Campus

Private schools

Secondary schools
 APEC Schools - Bacoor
 Arcland school of Cavite
 Academia De Covina
 Academy for Christian Education
 Academy of Gentle Potter's Children
 AMA Computer Learning Center
 Angelicum Immanuel Montessori of Cavite 
 Bacoor Sheperd School
 Bacoor Parish School
 Bacoor Evangelical School
 Bacoor Parochial School of St. Michael the Archangel
 Bearer of Light and Wisdom Colleges
 Benedictine School of Cavite
 Bueno De Meraniel's Learning Institute
 Bristle Oak Academy
 Casa De San Miguel Montessori School
 Cavite Christian School
 Cavite School of Life - Bacoor
 Cavite School Of St. Mark
 Crest View Academy of Cavite 
 Chain of Wisdom Colleges of Cavite (Formerly Chain of Wisdom House of Learning)
 Christian Values School
 Crossroads Christian Academy
 Diamond Academy
 Divine Light Academy
 Divine Jesus Learning Center
 Don Stevens Institute of Cavite
 Erica Learning Center
 First Books Learning Center
 Five Star Standard College
 God's Grace Christian School
 Green Valley Academy
 Graceland Academy
 GudNad Academe
 Harrell Horne Integrated School
 Higher Ground Academy
 Imus Computer College - Bacoor Branch
 INA Internet Learning Center
 John Paul Montessori School
 Joseph Immanuel School
 Jubileum Academy of Bacoor
 King Solomon Integrated School
 King James Academy - Cavite
 La Camelle School
 La Vlaize Integrated Science School - Bacoor Branch
 Little Angels Montessori School
 Little Angels Learning School
 Love Christian Academy
 Marie Osmund Schools
 Macasa Learning Center
 Marella Christian Institute
 Marvelous Faith Academy of Bacoor
 Marville Center Of Education
 Millennium Christian High School of Cavite
 Mizpah Community Academy Foundation
 Montessori dei San Lorenzo
 Mother Theresa School - Main
 Newville Heights Academy
 Norquins Living Legacy Academy
 Peak Hills School
 Pillars of God Academy of Bacoor
 Our Lady of Lourdes Academy of Bacoor Cavite
 Pimsat College Bacoor Cavite
 Phoenix International School of Science and Technology
 Queen’s Row Integrated Science School
 Quest Academy
 Rochepol Jane Academy
 Ruther E. Esconde School of Multiple Intelligences
 School of St. Mark
 Seven Seas Academy
 Statefields School
 St. Alphonsus Liguori Integrated School
 St. Clare de Molino Academy
 St. Francis Institute, Learning and Business High School
 St. Jerome Emiliani Institute
 St. John Fisher School
 St. Matthew Academy Of Cavite
 St. Michael's Institute
 St. Peregrine Institute
 St. Thomas More Academy
 St. Vincent De Paul College
 Technology Integrated Montessori of Meadowood
 The Bearer of Light and Wisdom Colleges
 The Palmridge School
 Theos Learning Center
 Theresian School of Cavite
 Villa Cecilia Academy of Arts and Technology
 Victorious Christian Montessori - Bacoor
 Waynesville Learning Center
 Young Shepherd's School

Tertiary Schools
 International School of Hotel and Restaurant Management
 University of Perpetual Help System Dalta - Molino Campus
 St. Dominic College of Asia
 St. Francis of Assisi College - Bacoor
 STI College Bacoor
 Woodridge College
 Cavite State University - Bacoor

References

 http://depedcalabarzon.ph/wp-content/uploads/2014/03/Masterlist-of-Private-Schools-%E2%80%93-Bacoor-City2.pdf
 http://depedcalabarzon.ph/masterlist-of-school/masterlist-of-private-schools-2/